Jan Bruin (born September 30, 1969 in Hollum, Ameland) is a retired Dutch footballer.

Club career
He has played the majority of his career in the Eerste Divisie for SC Cambuur, FC Volendam and FC Zwolle before finishing his career at Stormvogels Telstar. He played as a striker.

Bruin is Cambuur's record goalscorer of all-time and currently works as an assistant coach at the club.

References

External links
Jan Bruin at Voetbal International

1969 births
Living people
Sportspeople from Ameland
Association football forwards
Dutch footballers
SC Cambuur players
PEC Zwolle players
FC Volendam players
SC Telstar players
Eredivisie players
Eerste Divisie players
Footballers from Friesland
Association football coaches